Tim Lane may refer to:

Tim Lane (journalist) (born 1951), Australian journalist and sports commentator
Tim Lane (rugby union) (born 1959), Australian rugby union coach and player
Tim Lane (Australian rules footballer) (1888–?), Australian rules footballer
Tim Lane (executive), American business executive